Nixi chicken are an indigenous breed of chicken in Yunnan, China. They are small and well adapted to living in a cold climate. Chicken soup made with Nixi chicken is a local delicacy.

References 

Chicken breeds originating in China